Peter Blomevenna  ; 29 March 1466 in Leiden – 14 August 1536 in Cologne) was a Carthusian author and prior of Cologne Charterhouse from 1507 to 1536.

He was a translator of Denis the Carthusian, among many other works, and an active opponent of early Protestantism. He was a close friend of Werner Rolewinck (died 1502).

Biography 
Because of the avarice of his parents, although they belonged to a wealthy background, he spent his first years in poverty and difficulties. He studied at the Faculty of Arts in Cologne from 1483, then entered the Carthusian monks in 1489 where he professed his vows on 7 March 1490. He is distinguished by his piety and his intellectual capacities. He was a close friend of the Carthusian Werner Rolevinck. At the age of forty, he was elected prior of the Charterhouse of Cologne, a position he assumed until his death. During troubled times, he emphasized a more personal mystique and the demands of the rule of his order. The Charterhouse quickly became an intellectual and mystical center of the time. He composed treatises, some of which were controversial (against the Anabaptists for example, who had seized Münster in February 1534). In his Enchiridion sacerdotum (1532), he clarified the mystery of the Holy Eucharist. His De Bonitate divina inspired many preachers. In 1509, he published Le Miroir de perfection by the Flemish Franciscan Harphius (1410–1477) and also translated his treatise Directorium Aureum Contemplativorum into Latin which he supplemented with explanatory notes. He edited many texts by Denis the Carthusian and opposed the growing Reformation in Assertio Purgatorii (1534) about Purgatory and the Anabaptists, in De Auctoriate Ecclesiaein (1535) on the teaching authority of the Church, in De Vario Modo adorandi Deum, Sanctos et eorum Imagines (1535) about images and the worship of God in beauty, and Candela Evangelica (1536).

Under the priorate of Peter of Leyden from 1506–1507, the Carthusian monastery of Cologne is half freed from the tutelage of the city of Cologne and its prince-archbishop and becomes a center of mystical thought of the Devotio Moderna. Taking advantage of the progress of the printing press, it disseminates in addition to the writings of Harphius, those of Tauler (of which Luther will however claim), Suso, Lanspergius (disciple of Peter Blomevenna) or even of Ruysbroeck, the Imitation of Jesus Christ, and especially the works of Denis the Carthusian (1424–1471), the doctor ecstaticus. For example, he has D. Dionysii Carthusiani Contra Alchoranum and sectam Machometicam libri quinque against the “Mohammedan sect” edited with an introduction composed by him. Under his priorate, the Charterhouse of Cologne flourished with between 16 and 25 professed monks and 16 to 17 lay brothers.

In 1520–1530, Peter had an extension built outside the spiritual fence in order to receive visitors wishing to follow the spiritual direction of the Carthusians. The editor of La Perle évangélique (remained anonymous) that he directs was one of them, no doubt pious beguines like Marie Van Houte d ' Oisterwijk. The Cologne Charterhouse also gave advice to the first Jesuits (Peter Faber and Peter Canisius). The writings of Peter Blomevenna were printed in 1538 by Dietrich Loher.

Gérard Kalkbrenner (1494–1566) succeeded him as prior.

Works 

 Sermo de Sancte Brunone (1516) 
 Vita sancti Brunonis (1516) 
 De bonitate divina
 Modus legendi Rosarium B. Mariæ Virginis (published at the end of Harphius ' Directorium aureum contemplativorum, published in 1509, 1510 and 1513) concerning the Carthusian rosary
 Enchiridion sacerdotum in quo quae ad divinissimam Eucharistiam et sacratissimae Missae officium attinent (1532)
 D. Dionysii Carthusiani, de his quae secundas Sacras Scripturas et orthodoxorum patrum sententias ... catholice credantur ... [cum epistolae noncupatoriis P. Blomevennae and T. Loer a Stratis] (1535)

Notes and references

External links
 Catholic Encyclopedia: Peter Blomevenna

Carthusians
1466 births
1536 deaths
Clergy from Leiden
Clergy from Cologne